All the President's Men is a 1976 American biographical political drama thriller film about the Watergate scandal that brought down the presidency of Richard Nixon. Directed by Alan J. Pakula with a screenplay by William Goldman, it is based on the 1974 non-fiction book of the same name by Carl Bernstein and Bob Woodward, the two journalists investigating the Watergate scandal for The Washington Post.

The film stars Robert Redford and Dustin Hoffman as Bob Woodward and Carl Bernstein, respectively; it was produced by Walter Coblenz for Redford's Wildwood Enterprises.

The film was nominated in multiple Oscar, Golden Globe and BAFTA categories, and in 2010, the film was selected for preservation in the United States National Film Registry by the Library of Congress as being "culturally, historically, or aesthetically significant."

Plot
On June 17, 1972, security guard Frank Wills at the Watergate complex finds a door's bolt taped over to prevent it from locking. He calls the police, who find and arrest five burglars in the Democratic National Committee headquarters within the complex. The next morning, The Washington Post assigns new reporter Bob Woodward to the local courthouse to cover the story, which is considered of minor importance.

Woodward learns that the five men—James W. McCord Jr. and four Cuban-Americans from Miami—possessed electronic bugging equipment and are represented by a high-priced "country club" attorney. At the arraignment, McCord identifies himself in court as having recently left the Central Intelligence Agency (CIA), and the others are also revealed to have CIA ties. Woodward connects the burglars to E. Howard Hunt, an employee of President Richard Nixon's White House counsel Charles Colson, and formerly of the CIA.

Carl Bernstein, another Post reporter, is assigned to cover the Watergate story with Woodward. The two young men are reluctant partners but work well together. Executive editor Benjamin Bradlee believes that their work lacks reliable sources and is not worthy of the Post'''s front page, but he encourages further investigation.

Woodward contacts a senior government official, an anonymous source whom he has used before and refers to as "Deep Throat." Communicating secretly, using a flag placed in a balcony flowerpot to signal meetings, they meet at night in an underground parking garage. Deep Throat speaks vaguely and with metaphors, avoiding substantial facts about the Watergate break-in, but promises to keep Woodward on the right path to the truth, advising Woodward to "follow the money."

Woodward and Bernstein connect the five burglars to corrupt activities involving campaign contributions to Nixon's Committee to Re-elect the President (CRP or CREEP). This includes a check for $25,000 paid by Kenneth H. Dahlberg, whom Miami authorities identified when investigating the Miami-based burglars. However, Bradlee and others at the Post still doubt the investigation and its dependence on sources such as Deep Throat, wondering why the Nixon administration should break the law when the president is almost certain to defeat his opponent, Democratic nominee George McGovern.

Through former CREEP treasurer Hugh W. Sloan, Jr., Woodward and Bernstein connect a slush fund of hundreds of thousands of dollars to White House chief of staff H. R. Haldeman—"the second most important man in this country"—and to former attorney general John N. Mitchell, now head of CREEP. They learn that CREEP was financing a "ratfucking" campaign to sabotage Democratic presidential candidates a year before the Watergate burglary, when Nixon was lagging Edmund Muskie in the polls.

While Bradlee's demand for thoroughness compels the reporters to obtain other sources to confirm the Haldeman connection, the White House issues a non-denial denial of the Posts above-the-fold story. Bradlee continues to encourage investigation.

Woodward again meets secretly with Deep Throat and demands that he be less evasive. Deep Throat reveals that Haldeman masterminded the Watergate break-in and cover-up. Deep Throat say, "the money and everything." He also states that the cover-up was not just intended to camouflage the CREEP involvement but also to hide "covert operations" involving "the entire U.S. intelligence community," including the CIA and FBI. He warns Woodward and Bernstein that their lives, and those of others, are in danger. He said that the two reporters homes are bugged. When the two relay this information to Bradlee and tell him that everyone is involved, Bradlee realizes that a constitutional crisis is coming, but tells them to move forward with the story.

On January 20, 1973, Bernstein and Woodward type the full story, while a television in the newsroom shows Nixon taking the oath of office for his second term as president. A montage of Watergate-related teletype headlines from the following years is shown, ending with the report of Nixon's resignation and the inauguration of Gerald Ford on August 9, 1974.

Cast

Differences from the book
Unlike the book, the film covers only the first seven months of the Watergate scandal, from the time of the break-in to Nixon's second inauguration on January 20, 1973. The film introduced the catchphrase "follow the money" in relation to the case, which did not appear in the book or in any Watergate documentation.

Production

Redford began asking about the Watergate break-in while promoting The Candidate and then read Woodward and Bernstein's Watergate stories in The Washington Post while waiting to start filming The Way We Were. Redford first spoke with Woodward in November 1972 after the mistake involving Hugh Sloan.

Redford bought the rights to Woodward and Bernstein's book in 1974 for $450,000 with the idea to adapt it into a film with a budget of $5 million. Ben Bradlee, executive editor of The Washington Post, realized that the film was going to be produced regardless of his approval and believed that it made "more sense to try to influence it factually." He hoped that the film would show newspapers "strive very hard for responsibility."

Redford hired William Goldman to write the script in 1974. Goldman has said that Woodward was extremely helpful to him but that Bernstein was not. Goldman wrote that his crucial decision regarding the screenplay's structure was to discard the second half of the book. After he delivered his first draft in August 1974, Warner Bros. agreed to finance the film.

Redford was not happy with Goldman's first draft. Woodward and Bernstein read it and also did not like it. Redford asked for their suggestions, but Bernstein and his girlfriend, writer Nora Ephron, wrote their own draft. Redford showed this draft to Goldman, suggesting that it might contain some material that he could integrate, but Goldman later called Redford's acceptance of the Bernstein–Ephron draft a "gutless betrayal." Redford later expressed dissatisfaction with the Ephron–Bernstein draft, saying, "a lot of it was sophomoric and way off the beat." According to Goldman, "in what they wrote, Bernstein was sure catnip to the ladies." He also said that one of Bernstein and Ephron's scenes was included in the final film, a bit in which Bernstein deceives a secretary in order to see someone, something that was not factually true.

Alan J. Pakula was hired to direct and requested rewrites from Goldman. In a 2011 biography, Redford claimed that he and Pakula held all-day sessions working on the script. Pakula spent hours interviewing editors and reporters, taking notes of their comments.

In 2011, Richard Stayton wrote an article for Written By magazine following his comparison of several drafts of the script, including the final production draft. He concluded that Redford's and Pakula's contributions were not significant, that Goldman was properly credited as the writer and that the final draft had "William Goldman's distinct signature on each page."

Casting
Redford first selected Al Pacino to play Bernstein, but later decided that Dustin Hoffman was a better fit for the role.

Jason Robards was always Redford's choice to play Ben Bradlee. However, Bradlee had recommended George C. Scott for the role, and he was somewhat unimpressed when Robards visited the Post offices to develop a feel for the newsroom. In advance of the shoot, Bradlee told Robards: "Just don't make me look like an asshole." At first, Pakula was worried that Robards could not carry Bradlee's easy elegance and command authority. Karl Malden, Hal Holbrook (who would ultimately play Deep Throat), John Forsythe, Leslie Nielsen, Henry Fonda, Richard Widmark, Christopher Plummer, Anthony Quinn, Gene Hackman, Burt Lancaster, Robert Stack, Robert Mitchum and Telly Savalas were also considered for the role.

Character actor Martin Balsam played managing editor Howard Simons. According to Bradlee, Simons felt that his involvement with the real story was greatly diminished in the script.

Bradlee teased Post publisher Katharine Graham about who would play her in the film. "Names like Katharine Hepburn, Lauren Bacall and Patricia Neal were tossed out—by us—to make her feel good," Bradlee said. "And names like Edna May Oliver or Marie Dressler, if it felt like teasing time. And then her role was dropped from the final script, half to her relief."

Redford and Hoffman divided top billing, with Redford billed above Hoffman in the posters and trailers while Hoffman was billed above Redford in the film itself, in precisely the same manner in which James Stewart and John Wayne had divided top billing for John Ford's The Man Who Shot Liberty Valance in 1962.

Filming
Hoffman and Redford visited The Washington Posts offices for months, attending news conferences and conducting research for their roles. As the Post denied the production permission to shoot in its newsroom, set designers took measurements of the newspaper's offices and took many photographs. Boxes of trash were gathered and transported to sets recreating the newsroom on two soundstages in Hollywood's Burbank Studios at a cost of $200,000. The filmmakers went to great lengths for accuracy and authenticity, including making replicas of outdated phone books. Nearly 200 desks at $500 each were purchased from the same firm that had sold desks to the Post in 1971. The desks were painted the same color as those of the newsroom. The production was supplied with a brick from the main lobby of the Post so that it could be duplicated in fiberglass for the set. Principal photography began on May 12, 1975, in Washington, D.C.

Reception

Box office
All the President's Men grossed $7,016,001 in its first week from 604 theatres, placing it atop the U.S. box office. It eventually grossed $70.6 million at the box office.

Critical response
At the time of the film's release, Roger Ebert of the Chicago Sun-Times awarded the film  stars out of 4, writing: "It provides the most observant study of working journalists we're ever likely to see in a feature film. And it succeeds brilliantly in suggesting the mixture of exhilaration, paranoia, self-doubt, and courage that permeated The Washington Post as its two young reporters went after a presidency." Variety magazine praised "ingenious direction [...] and scripting" that overcame the difficult lack of drama that a story about reporters running down a story might otherwise have. Dave Kehr of the Chicago Reader was critical of the writing and called the film "pedestrian" and "a study in missed opportunities." Gene Siskel named it the best film of 1976 on his year-end list.

On review aggregator Rotten Tomatoes, the film has a 94% rating based on 64 reviews, with an average rating of 9.10/10. The website's critics consensus reads: "A taut, solidly acted paean to the benefits of a free press and the dangers of unchecked power, made all the more effective by its origins in real-life events." On Metacritic, which gives a weighted average score, the film has a score of 84 out of 100, based on reviews from 13 critics, indicating "universal acclaim."

Accolades
 In 2015, The Hollywood Reporter polled hundreds of Academy members, asking them to revote on past controversial decisions. Academy members indicated that, given a second chance, they would award the 1977 Oscar for Best Picture to All the President's Men instead of to Rocky.
 It became one of the seven films to win Best Picture from three out of four major U.S. film critics' groups (LA, NBR, NY', NSFC) along with Nashville, Terms of Endearment, Goodfellas, Pulp Fiction, The Hurt Locker, and Drive My Car.
 In 2007, Entertainment Weekly ranked All the President's Men as one of its 25 Powerful Political Thrillers.

American Film Institute
 AFI's 100 Years... 100 Thrills – #57
 AFI's 100 Years... 100 Heroes and Villains:
 Bob Woodward and Carl Bernstein – #27 Heroes
 AFI's 100 Years... 100 Movie Quotes
 "Follow the money." – Nominated.
 AFI's 100 Years...100 Cheers – #34
 AFI's 100 Years...100 Movies: 10th Anniversary Edition – #77

"All the President's Men" Revisited
Sundance Productions, which Redford owns, produced a two-hour documentary entitled "All the President's Men" Revisited. Broadcast on Discovery Channel Worldwide on April 21, 2013, the documentary focuses on the Watergate case and the subsequent film adaptation. It simultaneously recounts how The Washington Post broke Watergate and how the scandal unfolded, going behind the scenes of the film. It explores how the Watergate scandal would be covered in the present day, whether such a scandal could happen again and who Richard Nixon was as a man. W. Mark Felt, deputy director of the FBI during the early 1970s, revealed his identity as Deep Throat in 2005, and this is also covered in the documentary.

Footage from the film is included, as are interviews with Redford and Hoffman as well as with real-life central characters including Woodward, Bernstein, Bradlee, John Dean, Alexander Butterfield and Fred Thompson, who served as minority counsel to the Senate Watergate Committee in his first major public appearance. Contemporary media figures such as Tom Brokaw, who was NBC News' White House correspondent during the scandal, Jill Abramson, Rachel Maddow and Jon Stewart also are featured in the documentary, which earned a 2013 Emmy nomination for Outstanding Documentary or Nonfiction Special.The Primetime Emmys  – All The President's Men Revisted  The Emmys

See also
 The Final Days (1989 film)
 The Post (2017 film)
 All the Prime Minister's Men (2021 documentary)

Notes

References
 Goldman, William (1982). Adventures in the Screen Trade''. Warner Books.

External links

 All The President's Men essay by Mike Canning at National Film Registry
 
 
 
 
 
 
 
 
 
   Ann Hornaday, "The 34 best political movies ever made" The Washington Post (Jan. 23, 2020), ranked No. 2

1976 films
1970s political drama films
American political drama films
American political thriller films
1970s Spanish-language films
Films directed by Alan J. Pakula
Films scored by David Shire
Films with screenplays by William Goldman
Biographical films about journalists
Films about elections
Films about freedom of expression
Films about security and surveillance
Films based on non-fiction books
Films about presidents of the United States
Films featuring a Best Supporting Actor Academy Award-winning performance
Cultural depictions of Richard Nixon
Films set in offices
Films set in Washington, D.C.
Films set in Miami
Films set in 1972
Films set in 1973
Films set in 1974
Films set in 1975
Films shot in Washington, D.C.
Films that won the Best Sound Mixing Academy Award
Films whose art director won the Best Art Direction Academy Award
Films whose writer won the Best Adapted Screenplay Academy Award
Procedural films
Watergate scandal in film
United States National Film Registry films
Warner Bros. films
Films about journalism
Films about Richard Nixon
Thriller films based on actual events
Films about The Washington Post
1970s buddy films
1970s political films
American neo-noir films
1976 drama films
Drama films based on actual events
National Society of Film Critics Award for Best Film winners
1970s English-language films
1970s American films